Friday Night Lights is the debut studio album by the Scottish indie rock band Attic Lights, released on 13 October 2008 on Island Records.

Francis MacDonald, of Teenage Fanclub and BMX Bandits fame, assisted with production.

Track listing
All songs written by Attic Lights
 "Never Get Sick Of The Sea" – 3:24		
 "Bring You Down" – 3:40		
 "Wendy" – 3:27		
 "Send Those Dark Eyes This Way" – 2:43		
 "Nothing But Love" – 3:47		
 "God" – 3:09		
 "The Dirty Thirst" – 3:33		
 "Walkie Talkie" – 2:32		
 "Late Night Sunshine" – 3:59		
 "Winter On" – 4:20

Bonus Tracks
 "I Could Be So Good for You" (Minder Theme Cover) - 2:42 (iTunes Bonus Track)

The album cover features an illustration of a MK 5 Ford Cortina.

Personnel
 Kev Sherry - vocals, guitar
 Colin McArdle - vocals, bass
 Jamie Houston - vocals, guitar, piano ("Send Those Dark Eyes This Way", "Nothing But Love"), keyboards ("Winter On")
 Tim Davidson - guitar, pedal steel guitar ("Wendy", "The Dirty Thirst"), baritone guitar ("Send Those Dark Eyes This Way", "Winter On"), vocals ("Winter On")
 Noel O'Donnell - vocals, drums, glockenspiel ("Bring You Down")
 Francis MacDonald - producer, additional percussion ("The Dirty Thirst")
 John McLaughlin - producer
 Stuart McCreadie - producer, mixing (tracks: 3, 4, 8)
 Chris Northcote - Engineer / Assistant Engineer
 Gordy Goudie - additional piano ("Never Get Sick of the Sea")
 Cenzo Townsend - mixing (tracks: 1, 2, 5, 7, 9, 10)
 Rich Costey - mixing ("God")
 Cairn String Quartet - strings (tracks: 2, 3, 9)

References

2008 debut albums
Attic Lights albums
Island Records albums